The Parliament of Lower Canada was the legislature for Lower Canada. It was created when the old Province of Quebec was split into Lower Canada and Upper Canada in 1791.

As in other Westminster-style legislatures, it consisted of three components:
The Queen of the United Kingdom of Great Britain and Ireland, represented by the Governor General of the Canadas (the Queen-in-Parliament)
The Legislative Council of Lower Canada (the upper house)
The Legislative Assembly of Lower Canada (the lower house)

As a result of the Lower Canada Rebellion of 1837, the Parliament of Lower Canada was dissolved and temporarily replaced by the Special Council of Lower Canada. Following the Lord Durham's 1839 Report to the British Government, Lower Canada was joined with Upper Canada to create the Province of Canada, and the Parliament of the Province of Canada was created to govern the two.

The Parliament was convened fifteen times in its history:
1st Parliament of Lower Canada 1791–1796
2nd Parliament of Lower Canada 1796–1800
3rd Parliament of Lower Canada 1800–1804
4th Parliament of Lower Canada 1804–1808
5th Parliament of Lower Canada 1808–1809
6th Parliament of Lower Canada 1809–1810
7th Parliament of Lower Canada 1810–1814
8th Parliament of Lower Canada 1814–1816
9th Parliament of Lower Canada 1816–1820
10th Parliament of Lower Canada April 1820
11th Parliament of Lower Canada 1820–1824
12th Parliament of Lower Canada 1824–1827
13th Parliament of Lower Canada 1827–1830
14th Parliament of Lower Canada 1830–1834
15th Parliament of Lower Canada 1834–1838

Lower Canada